The Myponga River is a stream on the north-western side of the Fleurieu Peninsula in the Australian state of South Australia.

See also

Myponga Reservoir

References

Rivers of South Australia
Fleurieu Peninsula